The Convento de San Clemente is a Renaissance convent located in the city of Toledo, in Castile-La Mancha, Spain. It was founded in the 13th century during the reign of Alfonso X of Castile the Wise (reigned 1252–1284). Inside the building there are a Roman cistern, Mudéjar architecture, remains of the Palacio de los Cervatos and many decorative elements.

It is a large building that contains a basements, a refectory, two cloisters, a chapter house, a church, a hallway, the nuns' choir, the portals, cisterns and other dependences.

It currently houses a museum dedicated to the marzipan that, according to a historic study and tradition, originated in this convent.

References

External links
 

13th-century religious buildings and structures
Bien de Interés Cultural landmarks in the City of Toledo
convents in Spain
food and drink museums
marzipan
museums in Toledo, Spain
Renaissance architecture in Castilla–La Mancha
Roman Catholic churches in Toledo, Spain